Andrew Edmund Armstrong Selous (born 27 April 1962) is a British politician who has served as the Member of Parliament (MP) for South West Bedfordshire since the 2001 general election. A member of the Conservative Party, he served as Minister of State for Prisons from 2014 to 2016 in the government of Prime Minister David Cameron. Since 2020, Selous has served as Second Church Estates Commissioner.

Early life
Selous was born in Marylebone to Gerald and Mary Selous (née Casey). He was educated at West Downs School, Eton College and the London School of Economics, receiving a BSc in Industry and Trade in 1984.

In 1981, Selous joined the Honourable Artillery Company. He served as a soldier until receiving a commission in the Royal Regiment of Fusiliers in October 1989. Selous was then transferred to the London Regiment in April 1993. He moved to the Regular Army Reserve of Officers in January 1996, thereby ending his active service. From 1988 until 1994, he was a director of his family firm CNS Electronics (now CNS Farnell). Then, from 1991 until 2001, he was an underwriter at Great Lakes Reinsurance (UK) PLC.

Parliamentary career
Selous was first elected to the House of Commons in 2001, and had previously contested the Sunderland North seat in 1997. He is a director and prominent member of the Conservative Christian Fellowship.

In 2006, Selous was promoted to Shadow Minister for Work and Pensions.

In the Coalition government, he was the Parliamentary Private Secretary to Iain Duncan Smith, Secretary of State for Work and Pensions, from 28 May 2010 to 16 July 2014. On 16 July 2014, he was appointed as Parliamentary Under Secretary of State in the Ministry of Justice with responsibility for Prisons and Probation and retained this role following the 2015 general election. However he was asked to step down from the government by Theresa May after she became Prime Minister in July 2016.

He attracted criticism in 2014 for reportedly stating at a Centre for Social Justice fringe meeting that "disabled people work harder because they're grateful to have a job". Selous subsequently said that he had simply been trying to convey the message that disabled people were valued by employers, and his observation that disabled people often work harder was supported by a spokesperson for Disability Rights UK.

Selous chairs the All Party Parliamentary Group on Strengthening Couple Relationships, and argues that cross-party efforts to prevent family breakdown can relieve pressure on the care system.
He was opposed to the Marriage (Same Sex Couples) Act 2013, arguing that it was directly contrary to what Jesus said.

He was appointed Second Church Estates Commissioner, responsible for representing the Church Commissioners in Parliament and in the General Synod of the Church of England, on 10 January 2020.

References

External links
 Andrew Selous MP Official site
 
 Andrew Selous: Electoral history and profile The Guardian
 Andrew Selous MP  BBC Democracy Live, 5 June 2010

News items
 Concerns over housing growth BBC News, 6 November 2003
 Swiss assisted suicide 'may be illegal' BBC News, 16 April 2003
 MP challenges Guides' age policy BBC News, 25 January 2002

1962 births
Living people
Military personnel from London
People educated at Eton College
Alumni of the London School of Economics
Conservative Party (UK) MPs for English constituencies
Honourable Artillery Company soldiers
Royal Regiment of Fusiliers officers
UK MPs 2001–2005
UK MPs 2005–2010
UK MPs 2010–2015
UK MPs 2015–2017
UK MPs 2017–2019
UK MPs 2019–present
Church Estates Commissioners